Whilton is a village and a civil parish in the English county of Northamptonshire. The population (including Slapton) at the 2011 Census was 271. The village is in West Northamptonshire. The nearest railway station is at Long Buckby for the Northampton loop of the West Coast Main Line which runs between Rugby, Northampton and London. The nearest airport is Birmingham Airport. Whilton gives its name to the nearby Whilton Locks and Whilton Marina on the Grand Union Canal.

History
The village's name means 'Wheel farm/settlement', either alluding to the circular hill on which the village stands or the bending course of the stream here.

Whilton is mentioned in the Domesday Book of 1068, where it is listed under the name of ‘Woltone’. The main tenant landowner was Robert, Count of Mortain who was the half-brother to William the Bastard, Duke of Normandy and later king William I of England.

Whilton gives its name to a book described as a Social-Legal Study of Dispute Settlement in Medieval England, called 'The Whilton Dispute,  1264 to 1380', written by Robert C Palmer, in which the Whelton family was engaged. The Mortimer & Montgomery families were also involved.

The Parish Church of Saint Andrew
The Parish Church of Saint Andrew is constructed from the local Northamptonshire Ironstone and was built between the 12th and 13th centuries, although very little remains of this original, having been restored in late 18th century. The tower had a ring of 6 bells, which had been given in 1777 by the patron of the time William Lucas Rose, who also paid for their installation and the building work. Three of these original bells and three newer replacements were recast and, with added metal, were made into a ring of eight bells in 1994. They were cast by the Whitechapel Bell Foundry. The tenor (heaviest) bell weighs  and bears the inscription: CANON J.J. RICHARDSON, PRIEST /HAROLD HAYNES, JANET C. BOWERS CHURCHWARDENS /WHITECHAPEL 1994. The church clock is unusual as it was originally a one handed clock divided into ¼ hours and therefore does not have 60 minutes. In 1779 William Lucas Rose also gave a gift of communion vessels which are still in use today. The Church’s east window, the only stained glass in the building, portrays the crucifixion of Jesus and dates from 1878.

Amenities
The nearby Whilton Marina is close to Whilton Locks on the Grand Union canal. It was dug out in 1971 by the Steele family who still own and operate the business. The marina has over 200 moorings. The village also has a karting track nearby called Whilton Mill.

References

External links 

Whilton Village website

Villages in Northamptonshire
Civil parishes in Northamptonshire
West Northamptonshire District